The European Federation of Taiwanese Associations (EFTA; ,) is a federation, which combines several associations by Taiwanese people in each European country. The object is to promote friendship among those European associations, support mutual corporation and continuing care for Taiwan's development and trends. At the present is 謝偉群 (HSIEH, Wei-qun) director general of EFTA, who lives in Germany.

Members

Annual Meetings

Publications 
EFTA publishes statements in irregular intervals about recent issues, which are consulted in political debates. This year on 11 July EFTA released a response to ROC on Taiwan's former president Chen Shuibian illegal imprisonment.

References

External links 

Politics of Taiwan
Society of Taiwan